The Caves of Nahal Me’arot / Wadi el-Mughara ("Caves Creek"), named here by the Hebrew and Arabic name of the valley where they are located, are a UNESCO Site of Human Evolution in the Carmel mountain range near Haifa in northern Israel. 

The four UNESCO-listed caves are:
 Tabun or Tanur cave (lit.: "Oven")
 Gamal or el-Jamal cave ("Camel")
 El Wad or Nahal cave ("Stream")
 Skhul or Gedi cave ("Kid")

The four caves were proclaimed a site of "outstanding universal value" by UNESCO in 2012. They are protected within a nature reserve.

The caves were used for habitation by hominins and prehistoric humans and contain unique evidence of very early burials, at the archaeological site of el-Wad cave in the Nahal Me'arot Nature Reserve.

Gallery

See also 
List of World Heritage Sites in Israel and Jerusalem
National parks and nature reserves of Israel
Skhul and Qafzeh hominins

References

External links 

 Official page at Israel Nature and Parks Authority website
UNESCO: Sites of Human Evolution at Mount Carmel: The Nahal Me’arot / Wadi el-Mughara Caves
Nahal Me'arot recognized as World Heritage Site

Nature reserves in Israel
Prehistoric sites in Israel
Protected areas of Haifa District
World Heritage Sites in Israel
 Caves of Israel
Mount Carmel